The La Marmora III government of Italy held office from 31 December 1865 until 20 June 1866, a total of  days, or .

Government parties
The government was composed by the following parties:

Composition

References

Italian governments
1864 establishments in Italy